Subject ( "lying beneath") may refer to:

Philosophy
Hypokeimenon, or subiectum, in metaphysics, the "internal", non-objective being of a thing
Subject (philosophy), a being that has subjective experiences, subjective consciousness, or a relationship with another entity

Linguistics
 Subject (grammar), who or what a sentence or a clause is about
 Subject case or nominative case, one of the grammatical cases for a noun

Music
 Subject (music), or 'theme'
 The melodic material presented first in a fugue
 Either of the two main groups of themes (first subject, second subject), in sonata form
Subject (album), a 2003 album by Dwele

Science and technology
 The individual, whether an adult person, a child or infant, or an animal, who is the subject of research.

Computing
 Subjects (programming), core elements in the subject-oriented programming paradigm
 Subject (access control)
 An element in the Resource Description Framework
 Subject (iMedia), Computer Science focuses on what happens inside a computer including programming, networking, security and cyber security. Creative iMedia focuses on the creative aspects such as graphics, video, animation and games design.

Library science and information science
 Subject (documents) (subject classification; subject indexing; subject searching)
 Subject term or index term, a descriptor of a document used in bibliographic records

Other uses
 Commoner, an individual subjected to rule by an elite, e.g. in feudalism
 Subject in a modern constitutional monarchy, e.g. British subject
 Course (education), a unit of academic instruction

See also
Subject matter (disambiguation)
Subjective (disambiguation)